Doo Dah, doo dahs, doodah or doodahs can refer to:
 the repeated line-ending of the lyrics of the 1850 song "Camptown Races"
"DooDah!", 1998 song by Cartoons, inspired by "Camptown Races" 
 Doo Dah Parade, held in Pasadena, California, US
 a placeholder name for an object, also doodad and doohickey

See also
 Bonzo Dog Doo-Dah Band
 "Zip-a-Dee-Doo-Dah"
 Duda (disambiguation)